Kuchlbauer Brewery is a traditional brewery in Abensberg, Bavaria federal state, Germany. It was founded in 1300 and the production is focused on the wheat beers, with annual volume about 110,000 hectoliters.

See also 
Kuchlbauer Tower
List of oldest companies

External links 

Homepage
Company on Facebook
Kuchlbauer Bier on Facebook

Breweries in Germany
Beer brands of Germany
13th-century establishments in the Holy Roman Empire